{{DISPLAYTITLE:E9 honeycomb}}
In geometry, an E9 honeycomb is a tessellation of uniform polytopes in hyperbolic 9-dimensional space. , also (E10) is a paracompact hyperbolic group, so either facets or vertex figures will not be bounded. 

E10 is last of the series of Coxeter groups with a bifurcated Coxeter-Dynkin diagram of lengths 6,2,1. There are 1023 unique E10 honeycombs by all combinations of its Coxeter-Dynkin diagram. There are no regular honeycombs in the family since its Coxeter diagram is a nonlinear graph, but there are three simplest ones, with a single ring at the end of its 3 branches: 621, 261, 162.

621 honeycomb

The 621 honeycomb is constructed from alternating 9-simplex and 9-orthoplex facets within the symmetry of the E10 Coxeter group.

This honeycomb is highly regular in the sense that its symmetry group (the affine E9 Weyl group) acts transitively on the k-faces for k ≤ 7. All of the k-faces for k ≤ 8 are simplices. 

This honeycomb is last in the series of k21 polytopes, enumerated by Thorold Gosset in 1900, listing polytopes and honeycombs constructed entirely of regular facets, although his list ended with the 8-dimensional the Euclidean honeycomb, 521.

Construction

It is created by a Wythoff construction upon a set of 10 hyperplane mirrors in 9-dimensional hyperbolic space.

The facet information can be extracted from its Coxeter-Dynkin diagram.
 

Removing the node on the end of the 2-length branch leaves the 9-orthoplex, 711.
 

Removing the node on the end of the 1-length branch leaves the 9-simplex.
 

The vertex figure is determined by removing the ringed node and ringing the neighboring node. This makes the 521 honeycomb.
 

The edge figure is determined from the vertex figure by removing the ringed node and ringing the neighboring node. This makes the 421 polytope.
 

The face figure is determined from the edge figure by removing the ringed node and ringing the neighboring node. This makes the 321 polytope.
 

The cell figure is determined from the face figure by removing the ringed node and ringing the neighboring node. This makes the 221 polytope.

Related polytopes and honeycombs 

The 621 is last in a dimensional series of semiregular polytopes and honeycombs, identified in 1900 by Thorold Gosset.  Each member of the sequence has the previous member as its vertex figure.  All facets of these polytopes are regular polytopes, namely simplexes and orthoplexes.

261 honeycomb

The 261 honeycomb is composed of 251 9-honeycomb and 9-simplex facets. It is the final figure in the 2k1 family.

Construction

It is created by a Wythoff construction upon a set of 10 hyperplane mirrors in 9-dimensional hyperbolic space.

The facet information can be extracted from its Coxeter-Dynkin diagram.
 

Removing the node on the short branch leaves the 9-simplex. 
 

Removing the node on the end of the 6-length branch leaves the 251 honeycomb. This is an infinite facet because E10 is a paracompact hyperbolic group.
 

The vertex figure is determined by removing the ringed node and ringing the neighboring node. This makes the 9-demicube, 161.
 

The edge figure is the vertex figure of the edge figure. This makes the rectified 8-simplex, 051.
 

The face figure is determined from the edge figure by removing the ringed node and ringing the neighboring node. This makes the 5-simplex prism.

Related polytopes and honeycombs 

The 261 is last in a dimensional series of uniform polytopes and honeycombs.

162 honeycomb 

The 162 honeycomb contains 152 (9-honeycomb) and 161 9-demicube facets. It is the final figure in the 1k2 polytope family.

Construction

It is created by a Wythoff construction upon a set of 10 hyperplane mirrors in 9-dimensional space.

The facet information can be extracted from its Coxeter-Dynkin diagram.
 

Removing the node on the end of the 2-length branch leaves the 9-demicube, 161.
 

Removing the node on the end of the 6-length branch leaves the 152 honeycomb.
 

The vertex figure is determined by removing the ringed node and ringing the neighboring node. This makes the birectified 9-simplex, 062.

Related polytopes and honeycombs 

The 162 is last in a dimensional series of uniform polytopes and honeycombs.

Notes

References
 The Symmetries of Things 2008, John H. Conway, Heidi Burgiel, Chaim Goodman-Strass,  
 Coxeter The Beauty of Geometry: Twelve Essays, Dover Publications, 1999,  (Chapter 3: Wythoff's Construction for Uniform Polytopes)
 Coxeter Regular Polytopes (1963), Macmillan Company
 Regular Polytopes, Third edition, (1973), Dover edition,  (Chapter 5: The Kaleidoscope)
 Kaleidoscopes: Selected Writings of H.S.M. Coxeter, edited by F. Arthur Sherk, Peter McMullen, Anthony C. Thompson, Asia Ivic Weiss, Wiley-Interscience Publication, 1995,  
 (Paper 24) H.S.M. Coxeter, Regular and Semi-Regular Polytopes III, [Math. Zeit. 200 (1988) 3-45]

10-polytopes